112 (one hundred [and] twelve) is the natural number following 111 and preceding 113.

Mathematics
112 is an abundant number, a heptagonal number, and a Harshad number.

112 is the number of connected graphs on 6 unlabeled nodes.

If an equilateral triangle has sides of length 112, then it contains an interior point at integer distances 57, 65, and 73 from its vertices. This is the smallest possible side length of an equilateral triangle that contains a point at integer distances from the vertices.

See also
 112 (disambiguation)

References

Integers